SUSE Linux Enterprise (often abbreviated to SLE) is a Linux-based operating system developed by SUSE. It is available in two editions, suffixed with Server (SLES) for servers and mainframes, and Desktop (SLED) for workstations and desktop computers. Its major versions are released at an interval of 3–4 years, while minor versions (called "Service Packs") are released about every 12 months. SUSE Linux Enterprise products receive more intense testing than the upstream openSUSE community product, with the intention that only mature, stable versions of the included components will make it through to the released enterprise product.

It is developed from a common code base with other SUSE Linux Enterprise products.

IBM's Watson was built on IBM's POWER7 systems using SLES. HPE's Frontier, world's first and fastest exascale supercomputer runs on SUSE's SLES 15 (HPE Cray OS).

In March 2018, SUSE Product Manager Jay Kruemcke wrote in SUSE blog that SUSE Linux Enterprise developers have ported it to Raspberry Pi.

SUSE Linux Enterprise Server
SLES was developed based on SUSE Linux by a small team led by Marcus Kraft and Bernhard Kaindl as principal developer who were supported by Joachim "Jos" Schröder. It was first released on October 31, 2000 as a version for IBM S/390 mainframe machines. In December 2000, the first enterprise client (Telia) was made public. In April 2001, the first SLES for x86 was released.

From a business perspective, SLES is not only a technical offering, but also has entangled a commercial offering (services and support). The initial business model was inspired by recurrent charges established in the mainframe world at this time, and innovated by Jürgen Geck and Malcom Yates. Based on customer needs and feedback as well as other evolving Linux based offerings the business model has been reworked by different people in the subsequent years until today.

SUSE Linux Enterprise Server 9 (SLES 9) was released in August 2004. Service Pack 4 was released in December 2007. It was supported by hardware vendors including IBM, HP, Sun Microsystems, Dell, SGI, Lenovo, and Fujitsu Siemens Computers.

SUSE Linux Enterprise Server 10 (SLES 10) was released in July 2006, and is also supported by the major hardware vendors. Service pack 4 was released in April 2011. SLES 10 shared a common codebase with SUSE Linux Enterprise Desktop 10—Novell's desktop distribution for business use—and other SUSE Linux Enterprise products.

SUSE Linux Enterprise Server 11 (SLES 11) was released on March 24, 2009 and included Linux kernel 2.6.27, Oracle Cluster File System Release 2, support for the OpenAIS cluster communication protocol for server and storage clustering, and Mono 2.0. SLES 11 SP1 (released May 2010) rebased the kernel version to 2.6.32. In February 2012, SLES 11 SP2 was released, based on kernel version 3.0.10.
SLES 11 SP2 included a Consistent Network Device Naming feature for Dell servers.

SUSE Linux Enterprise Server 12 (SLES 12) beta was made available on February 25, 2014, and the final version was released on October 27, 2014.
SLES 12 SP1 was released on December 18, 2015. SP1 added Docker, Shibboleth, Network Teaming, and JeOS images.
SP2 was released November 11, 2016.
SP3 was released September 7, 2017.

The SLES 13 and SLES 14 version numbers were skipped due to superstitions associated with those numbers in certain cultures.

SUSE Linux Enterprise Server 15 (SLES 15) beta 1 was released on October 18, 2017, and the final version was released on July 16, 2018. SLES 15 SP2, which updates the kernel, PostgreSQL, Samba, Salt and many other parts of the operating system, was released on July 21, 2020.

SUSE Linux Enterprise Desktop

SUSE Linux Enterprise Desktop (SLED), introduced as Novell Linux Desktop (NLD), targeted at the business market, it is developed from a common codebase with SUSE Linux Enterprise Server (SLES) and other SUSE Linux Enterprise (SLE) products. SLED includes the GNOME Shell, LibreOffice, Evolution and many other popular open source packages such as Dia, TigerVNC, and lftp. Like SLES, SLED is based on openSUSE Tumbleweed and shares a common codebase with openSUSE Leap.

SLED since version 12 has included a modified version of the GNOME Classic Shell to include a layout with one panel on the bottom of the screen, traditional application menus, and desktop icons for traditional desktop users. It also includes LibreOffice, Mozilla Firefox, and Evolution along with many standard GNOME utilities, such as GNOME Documents and GNOME Files. As well, the YaST Control Center allows end users to make advanced changes to the system from the command line.

HP offers business notebooks with SLED 11 preinstalled, under both its own brand and the Compaq brand.

Micro-Star International offered MSI Wind Netbooks with SLED 10 preinstalled. Sun Microsystems previously licensed SLED as the basis of the Linux version of Java Desktop System.

History

SUSE Linux Enterprise Desktop has been developed while SUSE was under the ownership of several different parent companies. SUSE was owned by and conducted business as Novell from SLED's first release as Novell Linux Desktop in 2004 until 2011 when The Attachmate Group purchased Novell and created SUSE as an autonomous subsidiary. Micro Focus in turn purchased The Attachmate Group in 2014 and made SUSE an autonomous business unit, before selling it to EQT Partners in 2019. EQT Partners is a private equity group that develops new companies before divesting them as independent companies.

Novell Linux Desktop 9
Novell Linux Desktop (NLD) 9 was originally released November 8, 2004, less than a year after Novell's acquisition of SUSE. There were a number of Service Packs (SP's) released for NLD 9. SP1 was released on February 11, 2005 and contained many updates. After that, SP2 was released on August 9, 2005, containing all the released updates and bugfixes since August 2004. SP3 was released on December 22, 2005.

NLD 9 was based on SUSE Linux 9.1 and offered a more conservative offering of desktop applications for businesses. Its desktop included common end user applications like Mozilla Firefox, OpenOffice.org. NLD also included software developed by Novell and its 2003 acquisition Ximian, such as the Red Carpet software management tool from Ximian and Novell's system management tool ZenWorks.

SUSE Linux Enterprise Desktop 10
With SLED 10, Novell increased the focus on features for a broader range of corporate users by focusing on meeting the needs for basic office workers, positioning SLED as a competitor to Microsoft Windows. Basic office workers were defined in this context as users who need basic desktop functionality, including an office suite, a collaboration client, a web browser, and instant messaging. Novell attempts to meet these needs by concentrating on making these components very compatible with existing enterprise infrastructure, such as Microsoft Office data files, Microsoft Active Directory, and Microsoft Exchange Server or Novell GroupWise collaboration systems.

It also included the Beagle desktop search tool, similar to Spotlight in Mac OS X v10.4. The Xgl+Compiz support enables a variety of advanced graphical effects in the user interface, such as "application tiling" (similar to Exposé). Other features include making it easier for Linux beginners to connect digital cameras to the computer and play audio files such as MP3s using Helix Banshee. The version of GNOME included this release was highly customized, and debuted the slab application menu on a one panel layout. SLED 10 was originally released June 17, 2006. The last service pack for SLED 10 was Service Pack 4, released April 15, 2011.

SUSE Linux Enterprise Desktop 11
SLED 11, based on openSUSE 11.1, was released March 24, 2009. It included an upgrade to GNOME and was the first release to ship KDE 4, with version 4.1.3. Several improvements were made to improve Microsoft Active Directory and Microsoft Exchange Server integration, and the Novell OpenOffice.org version was upgraded to version 3.0. SLED continued to include some proprietary components such as Adobe Flash, as well as open-source implementations of closed sourced plugins and runtimes such as Moonlight and Mono.

Four service packs were released for SLED 11, with Service Pack 2 notably bringing BtrFS commercial support to the enterprise Linux market and including the snapper tool to manage BtrFS snapshots. The most current service pack, SP 4, was released July 17, 2015.

SUSE Linux Enterprise Desktop 12
On October 28, 2014, SUSE (now an independent business unit) released SLED 12 built on openSUSE 13.1. SLED 12 introduced several new technological upgrades, including systemd, GNOME 3, GRUB 2, plymouth, and the in-house built wicked wireless network manager. SLED 12 also included further stability and integration with BtrFS. With the transition to GNOME 3, the GNOME Classic Shell, the vanilla GNOME Shell, and a SLE Classic Shell with a design that more closely mimics the slab layout were included. KDE, the default desktop environment in openSUSE, and support for 32-bit x86 processors were dropped from the enterprise distribution.

SLE 12 Service Pack 1 was the first to be the basis for openSUSE's more conservative Leap series, with openSUSE Leap 42.1 sharing its codebase with SLE 12 SP 1. Leap 42.2 and 42.3 were built from the same codebase as SLE 12 SP 2 and SLE SP 3 respectively. SLED 12's underlying base, SUSE Linux Enterprise Server 12, was the first version of SLE to be offered on the Microsoft Store to be run on the Windows Subsystem for Linux.

SUSE Linux Enterprise Desktop 15
SLE skipped over versions 13 and 14, realigning the versions of openSUSE Leap and SLE at version 15. SLE 15 was released June 25, 2018 with the same codebase as openSUSE Leap 15.0. SLED 15 included major upgrades to GNOME 3.26, LibreOffice 6.0, GCC 7 and LTS kernel version 4.12. Version 15 also made the Wayland implementation of GNOME the default. SLES and SLED can now also be installed from the same media. SLED 15 offers the same GNOME Desktop options as SLED 12.

SLE 15 SP 1 shares a common codebase with openSUSE Leap 15.1. SLE 15 SP 1 includes improvements to the ability to migrate from openSUSE Leap to SLE, increased 64-bit Arm System on a Chip (SoC) supported processor options, transactional updates, and various other features.

SLE 15 SP 3 features a unified repository with same source code and binary packages with openSUSE Leap 15.3.

People
Novell's effort on SUSE Linux Enterprise Desktop 10 was led by Nat Friedman, one of the two founders of Ximian. Nat was aided by a host of former Ximian and SUSE developers, with product manager Guy Lunardi and engineering manager Kelli Frame.

Derivatives

Through SUSE Studio Express, users can create custom appliances based on SUSE Linux Distributions including SLED. Options for SLE allow for the creation of derivative distributions as custom Kiwi and docker containers with customized package choices and configuration parameters.

Unique Features
YaST Control Center

YaST is the primary configuration tool in the SUSE Linux distributions, including SLED. YaST is an installation and administration program which can handle hard disk partitioning, system setup, RPM package management, online updates, network and firewall configuration, user administration and more in an integrated interface consisting of various modules for each administrative task.

SUSE Package Hub
SUSE Package Hub gives SLE users the option to install packages that are not an official part of the SUSE Linux Enterprise distribution or are more up to date than those included with the latest version of SLE. SUSE Package Hub is unofficial, and the software installed from its repositories does not receive commercial support from SUSE. Currently about 9,000 packages are available from SUSE Package Hub for SLE 12 and 15 with packages available for AArch64, ppc64le, s390x, and x86-64.

End-of-support schedule
Legacy versions of SUSE Linux Enterprise (SLES 9 and 10) had a ten year product lifecycle. Newer versions have a thirteen year product lifecycle (SLES 11, 12, and 15). The current support model consists of 10 years of general support from time of First Customer Shipment (FCS), followed by 3 years of Long Term Service Pack Support (LTSS).

Version history
Release dates of SUSE Linux Enterprise Server versions:
 SuSE Linux Enterprise Server
 for S/390, October 31, 2000
 for Sparc and IA-32, April 2001
 SUSE Linux Enterprise Server 7 (For first time, common codebase for all architectures (IA-32, Itanium, iSeries and pSeries, S/390 and zSeries 31-bit, zSeries 64-bit))
 Initial release, October 13, 2001
 SUSE Linux Enterprise Server 8
 Initial release, October 2002
 SP1
 SP2
 SP2a
 SP3
 SP4
 SUSE Linux Enterprise Server 9
 Initial release, 2004-08-03
 SP1, 2005-01-19
 SP2, 2005-07-07
 SP3, 2005-12-22
 SP4, 2007-12-12
 SUSE Linux Enterprise Server 10
 Initial release, 2006-06-17
 SP1, 2007-06-18
 SP2, 2008-05-19
 SP3, 2009-10-12
 SP4, 2011-04-12
 SUSE Linux Enterprise Server 11
 Initial release, 2009-03-24
 SP1, 2010-06-02
 SP2, 2012-02-15
 SP3, 2013-07-01
 SP4, 2015-07-16
 SUSE Linux Enterprise Server 12
 Initial release, 2014-10-27
 SP1, 2016-01-12
 SP2, 2016-11-11
 SP3, 2017-09-07
 SP4, 2018-12-11
 SP5, 2019-12-09
 SUSE Linux Enterprise Server 13
 Skipped
 SUSE Linux Enterprise Server 14
 Skipped
 SUSE Linux Enterprise Server 15
 Initial release, 2018-07-16
 SP1, 2019-06-24
 SP2, 2020-07-21
 SP3, 2021-06-23
 SP4, 2022-06-24

See also

 SUSE Linux
 Linux on PowerPC
 Linux on IBM Z
 List of Linux distributions
 Comparison of Linux distributions
 Red Hat Enterprise Linux

References

Further reading
Server
 
 
 
 
 
 

Desktop

External links
 
 
 SUSE blog
 Example story of SLED 10 use in an educational environment
 Interview with Novell's Ted Haeger on NLD
 News about the next Novell Linux Desktop
 Novell aims rebranded SUSE Linux 10 at enterprise desktops - DesktopLinux.com news item about upcoming SUSE Linux Enterprise Desktop 10

Enterprise Linux distributions
ARM Linux distributions
Linux distributions
Linux distributions used in appliances
Power ISA Linux distributions
RPM-based Linux distributions
SUSE Linux
X86-64 Linux distributions